Los Jardines or Los Buenos Jardines (Spanish for "the good gardens") are phantom islands supposedly located northeast of the Mariana Islands. 

The islands were reportedly visited by Spanish explorers Álvaro de Saavedra Cerón (who named them Los Buenos Jardines) in 1528 and Ruy López de Villalobos (who called them Los Jardines) in 1542.  Sighted again by John Marshall in 1788, they were purported to be part of an Anson Archipelago, which included other phantom islands such as Ganges Island as well as real islands such as Wake and Marcus Islands.  In 1973, the International Hydrographic Organization removed them from its charts.

References

Phantom islands
Islands of the Pacific Ocean
1528 in the Spanish Empire